

Joachim Coeler (1 June 1891 – 14 May 1955) was a German general during World War II. He was a recipient of the Knight's Cross of the Iron Cross of Nazi Germany.

Awards 

 Knight's Cross of the Iron Cross on 12 July 1940 as Generalmajor and commander of 9. Flieger-Division

References

Citations

Bibliography

 

1891 births
1955 deaths
Scientists from Poznań
People from the Province of Posen
Luftwaffe World War II generals
German Army personnel of World War I
Imperial German Navy personnel
Recipients of the clasp to the Iron Cross, 1st class
Recipients of the Knight's Cross of the Iron Cross
Generals of Aviators